Grete Mogensen (born 15 May 1963, later Grete Kragekjær) is a retired female badminton player from Denmark. She competed at the 1992 Summer Olympics.

Career
She won the bronze medal at the 1991 IBF World Championships in mixed doubles with Jon Holst-Christensen. Grete Kragekjær (previously Mogensen) won the gold medal with Jon Holst-Christensen in mixed doubles at the European Championships in 1990, the same year as they became Danish Champions. In 1993 they won the All England title. They also won a bronze medal at the World Championships in 1991 and lost the final in 1993. Grete won the Danish Championships in Women's doubles both in 1992 and 1993, and in 1991 she became Danish Champion in mixed doubles with Holst-Christensen. She played 47 matches for the Danish national team between 1983-1993.

References

Danish female badminton players
Living people
1963 births
Olympic badminton players of Denmark
Badminton players at the 1992 Summer Olympics
Sportspeople from the Central Denmark Region
20th-century Danish women